The Afghanistan national badminton team (Pashto: د افغانستان د بیډمنټن ملي لوبډله) represents Afghanistan in international badminton team competitions. It is controlled by the Badminton Federation of Afghanistan and competes under the South Asian region. Afghanistan competed in the Asian Games individual event. The Afghan junior team has competed in the BWF World Junior Championships mixed team event, also known as the Suhandinata Cup. The team finished in 34th place.

History 
The Afghanistan badminton team was formed in 1974. The team, along with the Badminton Federation of Afghanistan were dissolved for a brief period of time during the Afghan War but were later revived in 2002. The national team have had trouble in competing international tournaments as the team lacked equipment and funding from the National Olympic Committee of the Islamic Republic of Afghanistan.

Men's team 
Afghanistan first competed in the 2016 South Asian Games. The team were drawn into Group A with India, Bangladesh and Maldives. The team lost all of their matches and were eliminated in the group stage.

Women's team 
The Afghani women's team first competed in the 2016 South Asian Games. They were drawn into Group A with India and Nepal. The team failed to qualify for the knockout stage after losing 0–3 to India and Nepal in the group stage.

Competitive record

South Asian Games

Men's team

Women's team

Junior competitive record

Suhandinata Cup

Mixed team

Players

Current squad

Men's team

Women's team

References 

Badminton
National badminton teams